Carthage Courthouse Square Historic District is a national historic district located at Carthage, Jasper County, Missouri.   The district encompasses 42 contributing buildings in the central business district of Carthage.  It developed in the late-19th and early-20th centuries and includes representative examples of Italianate and Romanesque Revival style architecture. Located in the district is the separately listed Jasper County Courthouse. Other notable buildings include the Bank of Carthage, Ben Franklin Store (1920s), Farmers and Drovers Bank / Miller Clothing Company (1875, 1908), Belk-Simpson Building (pre-1884), Carthage Water & Electric Co. (pre-1884), Snyder Building (1901), Drake Hotel (1920), Fire Department (1883), Leggett and Platt (1920), McNerney Block (1905), and Carthage National Bank.

It was listed on the National Register of Historic Places in 1980.

References

Historic districts on the National Register of Historic Places in Missouri
Italianate architecture in Missouri
Romanesque Revival architecture in Missouri
Buildings and structures in Jasper County, Missouri
National Register of Historic Places in Jasper County, Missouri